A parent-in-law is a person who has a legal affinity with another by being the parent of the other's spouse. Many cultures and legal systems impose duties and responsibilities on persons connected by this relationship. A person is a child-in-law to the parents of the spouse, who are in turn also the parents of those sibling-in-laws (if any) who are siblings of the spouse (as opposed to spouses of siblings). Together, the members of this family affinity group are called the in-laws.

Fathers-in-law
A father-in-law is the father of a person's spouse. Two men who are fathers-in-law to each other's children may be called co-fathers-in-law, or, if there are grandchildren, co-grandfathers.

Mothers-in-law
A mother-in-law is the mother of a person's spouse. Two women who are mothers-in-law to each other's children may be called co-mothers-in-law, or, if there are grandchildren, co-grandmothers. 

In comedy and in popular culture, the mother-in-law is stereotyped as bossy, unfriendly, hostile, nosy, overbearing and generally unpleasant. They are often depicted as the bane of the husband, who is married to the mother-in-law's daughter. A mother-in-law joke is a joke that lampoons the obnoxious mother-in-law character.

Some Australian Aboriginal languages use avoidance speech, so-called "mother-in-law languages", special sub-languages used when in hearing distance of taboo relatives, most commonly the mother-in-law.

A mother-in-law suite is also a type of dwelling, usually guest accommodations within a family home that may be used for members of the extended family.

See also
 Affinity (law)
 Marriage
 Mother-in-law apartment
 Mother-in-law house
 Mother-in-law joke

References

External links

Audio recording of the Brothers Grimm folktale "The Mother-in-law"

Affinity (law)
Fatherhood
Motherhood

et:Sugulussuhted#Hõimlus
es:Suegra
it:Parentela#Gradi di parentela comuni
sv:Svärfamilj#Svärföräldrar
tr: kayınvalide